Samuel Clesson Allen (January 5, 1772 – February 8, 1842) was a U.S. politician from Massachusetts during the first third of the 19th century. He began his career as a member of the Federalist Party, but later became a staunch supporter of Democratic presidents Andrew Jackson and Martin Van Buren.

Allen was born in Bernardston in the Province of Massachusetts Bay and schooled in nearby New Salem. He was descended from Edward Allen (1640–1696), who was born in England and settled in the Connecticut Colony. He graduated from Dartmouth College in 1794, and was ordained as a Congregational minister. After serving three years in the pulpit, Allen began to study law, and was admitted to the Massachusetts bar in 1800.

Allen began his career in politics in 1806, when he was elected to the Massachusetts House of Representatives. He served in the House until 1810, then served in the Massachusetts Senate from 1812 to 1815. A year after leaving the state senate, he was elected to the United States House of Representatives, where he sat as a Federalist from 1817 to 1829. He was a noted supporter of the John Quincy Adams administration.

After returning to Massachusetts, Allen became affected by the plight of western Massachusetts farmers and laborers, whose lives were being upended by industrialization. As a result of his observations and concerns, Allen became a vocal supporter of the Massachusetts Workingmen's Party, and was the party's unsuccessful nominee for state governor in 1833 and 1834.

Allen died in Northfield, Massachusetts, and was buried in Bernardston.

Legacy
Allen's son, Elisha Hunt Allen, also served in the United States Congress.

References and external links
 
 Schlesinger, Arthur M, Jr. The Age of Jackson. Boston : Little, Brown, 1953 [1945].

References

1772 births
1842 deaths
People from Bernardston, Massachusetts
American people of English descent
American Congregationalist ministers
Federalist Party members of the United States House of Representatives from Massachusetts
National Republican Party members of the United States House of Representatives from Massachusetts
Members of the Massachusetts House of Representatives
Massachusetts state senators
Dartmouth College alumni